Gari Keith Ledyard (born 1932 in Syracuse, New York; died 29 October 2021 ) was Sejong Professor of Korean History Emeritus at Columbia University. He is best known for his work on the history of the Hangul alphabet.

Biography
Ledyard was born while his family happened to be in Syracuse for work during the Depression. He grew up in Detroit and Ann Arbor, Michigan, and moved with his family to San Rafael, California, in 1948. After high school, he attended the University of Michigan and San Francisco State College, but did not do well, and in 1953 he joined the army to avoid the draft. Luckily, he missed so much basic training due to illness that he had to repeat it, and during that time opportunities opened up for language training, one of his interests.

He was scheduled for one year intensive Russian language training at the Army Language School in Monterey, but was soon reassigned to Korean. He graduated too high in his class to be sent to Korea, but after a few months was able to get a posting in Tokyo in July 1955, and then a transfer to Seoul in November. While there, he looked up the families of his Korean teachers, ate in town, and taught at the American Language Institute. When his superiors found out, he was accused of fraternization and reassigned to Tokyo, after only nine months in Korea, and returned to the US in December.

The next spring he enrolled in the University of California at Berkeley, in Chinese language and literature, studying under, among others, Peter Alexis Boodberg and Zhao Yuanren, as there was no Korean Studies program in the United States at the time. For his bachelor's degree in 1958 he translated the Hunmin Jeongeum Haerye into English; for his master's degree in 1963 he documented early Korean–Mongol diplomatic relations; and with a year for research in Seoul for his dissertation, he received his PhD in 1966 and a position at Columbia, at the Centre for Korean Research, succeeding William E. Skillend. He was made a full professor in 1977, and retired in 2001.

Ledyard's dissertation was The Korean Language Reform of 1446, on King Sejong's alphabet project, but concerned with the political implications and controversies of hangul as much as its creation. Unfortunately, he failed to copyright his dissertation, and it was distributed in microfilm and photocopy, so that he could not copyright it and publish without substantial revision. He was finally convinced to do so by the first director of the National Academy of the Korean Language, Lee Ki-Moon, and the book was published in Korea in 1998.

He has also published on Korean cartography, the alliance between Korea and China during the first Japanese invasions, and the relationship between the wars of the Three Kingdoms and the founding of the Japanese state from Korea. He also wrote a book about the journal written by the 17th century Dutch explorer Hendrick Hamel who was held hostage in Korea for 13 years. The title of this book is 'The Dutch come to Korea' and was first published in 1971. He was invited to visit North Korea in 1988.

Research on the origin of hangul

Ledyard believes, following, French orientalist, Jean-Pierre Abel-Rémusat in 1820, that the basic hangul consonants were adopted from the Mongolian Phagspa script of the Yuan dynasty, known as the 蒙古篆字 měnggǔ zhuānzì (Mongol seal script).

Only five letters were adopted from Phagspa, with most of the rest of the consonants created by featural derivation from these, as described in the account in the Hunmin Jeong-eum Haerye. However, which letters the basic consonants were differs between the two accounts. Whereas the Haerye implies that the graphically simplest letters ㄱㄴㅁㅅㅇ are basic, with others derived from them by the addition of strokes (though with ㆁㄹㅿ set apart), Ledyard believes the five phonologically simplest letters ㄱㄷㄹㅂㅈ, which were basic in Chinese phonology, were also basic to hangul, with strokes either added or subtracted to derive the other letters. It was these five core letters which were taken from the Phagspa script, and ultimately derive from the Tibetan letters ག ད ལ བ ས. Thus they may be cognate with Greek Γ Δ Λ Β and the letters C/G D L B of the Latin alphabet. (The history of the S sounds between Tibetan and Greek is more difficult to reconstruct.) A sixth basic letter, ㅇ, was an invention, as in the Haerye account.

The creation of the vowel letters is essentially the same in the two accounts.

Consonantal design 

The Hunmin Jeong-eum credits the 古篆字 "Gu Seal Script" as being the source King Sejong or his ministers used to create hangul. This has traditionally been interpreted as the Old Seal Script, and has confused philologists because hangul bears no functional similarity to the Chinese seal scripts. However, 古 gǔ had more than one meaning: besides meaning old, it could be used to refer to the Mongols (蒙古 Měng-gǔ). Records from Sejong's day played with this ambiguity, joking that "no one is more gu than the Meng-gu". That is, Gu Seal Script may have been a veiled reference to the Mongol Seal Script, or Phagspa alphabet. (Seal script is a style of writing, used for name seals and official stamps. Phagspa had a seal script variant modeled after the appearance of the Chinese seal script of its day. In this guise it was called the 蒙古篆字 Mongol Seal Script, with only the initial character distinguishing it from the 古篆字 credited by the Hunmin Jeong-eum as the source of hangul.) There were many Phagspa manuscripts in the Korean palace library, and several of Sejong's ministers knew the script well.

If this were the case, Sejong's evasion on the Mongol connection can be understood in light of Korea's relationship with China after the fall of the Yuan dynasty, as well as the Korean literati's contempt for the Mongols as "barbarians". Indeed, such China-centered resistance kept hangul out of common use until the dawn of the twentieth century.

Although several of the basic concepts of hangul came from Indic phonology through the Phagspa script, such as the relationships among the homorganic consonants and, of course, the alphabetic principle itself, Chinese phonology also played a major role. Besides the grouping of letters into syllables, along the lines of Chinese characters, it was Chinese phonology, not Indic, that determined which five consonants were basic, and therefore to be retained from Phagspa. These were the tenuis (non-voiced, non-aspirated) plosives, g for ㄱ , d for ㄷ , and b for ㅂ , which were basic to Chinese theory, but which were voiced in the Indic languages and not considered basic; as well as the sibilant s for ㅈ  and the liquid l for ㄹ . (Korean ㅈ was pronounced  in the 15th century.)

(It is somewhat problematic that hangul ㅈ [ts] has been derived from Phagspa s [s] rather than from dz [ts]. However, the shape of the Phagspa s may have been more conducive to deriving multiple hangul letters than Phagspa dz would have been. Such a shift could easily have happened if the entire Phagspa alphabet were first used as a template for the new alphabet, and then whittled down to a minimal set of basic letters through featural derivation, so that a more convenient shape from among the Phagspa letters  could be used as the basis for the hangul letters for the sibilants .)

The basic hangul letters have been simplified graphically, retaining the essential shape of Phagspa but with a reduced number of strokes. For example, the box inside Phagspa g is not found in hangul ㄱ [k]. This simplification allowed for complex clusters, but also left room for an additional stroke to derive the aspirate plosives, ㅋㅌㅍㅊ. On the other hand, the non-plosives, nasals ng (see below) ㄴㅁ and the fricative ㅅ, were derived by removing the top of the tenuis letter. (No letters were derived from ㄹ.) This clears up a few points. For example, it is easy to derive ㅁ from ㅂ by removing the top of ㅂ, but it is not clear how one would get ㅂ by adding something to ㅁ, since ㅂ is not analogous to the other plosives: if they were derived, as in the traditional account, we'd expect them all to have a similar vertical top stroke.

Sejong also needed a null symbol to refer to the lack of a consonant, and he chose the circle, ㅇ. The subsequent derivation of the glottal stop ㆆ, by adding a vertical top stroke by analogy with the other plosives, and the aspirate ㅎ parallel the account in the Hunmin Jeong-eum. The phonetic theory inherent in this derivation is more accurate than modern IPA usage. In the IPA, the glottal consonants are posited as having a specific "glottal" place of articulation. However, recent phonetic theory has come to view the glottal stop and [h] to be isolated features of 'stop' and 'aspiration' without a true place of articulation, just as their hangul representations based on the null symbol assume.

The ng is the odd letter out here, as it is in the Hunmin Jeong-eum. This may reflect its variable behavior. Hangul was designed not just to write Korean, but to accurately represent Chinese. Besides the letters covered here, there were quite a few more used to represent Chinese etymology. Now, many Chinese words began with ng, at least historically, and this was being lost in several regions of China by Sejong's day: that is, etymological ng was either silent or pronounced  in China, and was silent when borrowed into Korean. The expected shape of ng had the additional problem that, by being just the vertical line left by removing the top stroke of ㄱ, it would have been easily confused with the vowel ㅣ . Sejong's solution solved both these problems: the vertical stroke from ㄱ was added to the null symbol ㅇ to create ᇰ, graphically representing both regional pronunciations as well as being easily legible. (If your browser doesn't display this, it's a circle with a vertical line on top, like an upside-down keyhole or lollipop.) Thus ᇰ was pronounced ng in the middle or end of a word, but was silent at the beginning. Eventually the graphic distinction between the two silent initials ㅇ and ᇰ was lost.

Two additional details lend credence to Ledyard's hypothesis. For one, the composition of obsolete ᇢᇦᇴ w, v, f (for Chinese initials 微非敷), from the graphic derivatives of the basic letter ㅂ b [p] (that is, ㅁㅂㅍ m, b, p) by adding a small circle under them, is parallel to their Phagspa equivalents, which were similarly derived by adding a small loop under three graphic variants of the letter h. Now, this small loop also represented w when it occurred after vowels in Phagspa. The Chinese initial 微 represented either m or w in various dialects, and this may be reflected in the choice of ㅁ [m] plus ㅇ (from Phagspa [w]) as the elements of hangul ᇢ. Not only is the series ᇢᇦᇴ analogous to Phagspa, but here we may have a second example of a letter composed of two elements to represent two regional pronunciations, m and w, as we saw with ᇰ for ng and null.

Secondly, most of the basic hangul letters were originally simple geometric shapes. For example, ㄱ was the corner of a square, ㅁ a full square, ㅅ was a caret-like Λ, ㅇ was a circle. In the Hunmin Jeong-eum, before the influence from Chinese calligraphy on hangul, these are purely geometric. However, ㄷ was different. It wasn't a simple half square, like we might expect if Sejong had simply created it ex nihilo. Rather, even in the Hunmin Jeong-eum, it had a small lip protruding from the upper left corner. This lip duplicates the shape of Phagspa d [t], and can be traced back to the Tibetan letter d, ད.

Vocalic design 
The seven basic vowel letters were not taken from Phagspa, but rather seem to have been invented by Sejong or his ministers to represent the phonological principles of Korean. Two methods were used to organize and classify these vowels, vowel harmony and iotation.

Of the seven vowels, four could be preceded by a y- sound ("iotized"). These four were written as a dot next to a line: ㅓㅏㅜㅗ. (Through the influence of Chinese calligraphy, the dots soon became connected to the line, as seen here.) Iotation was then indicated by doubling this dot: ㅕㅑㅠㅛ. The three vowels which could not be yotized were written with a single stroke: ㅡㆍㅣ.

The Korean language of this period had vowel harmony to a greater extent than it does today. Vowels alternated according to their environment, and fell into "harmonic" groups. This affected the morphology of the language, and Korean phonology described it in terms of yin and yang: If a word had yang ('bright') vowels, then most suffixes also had to have a yang vowel; and conversely, if the root had yin ('dark') vowels, the suffixes needed to be yin as well. There was a third group called "mediating" ('neutral' in Western terminology) that could coexist with either yin or yang vowels.

The Korean neutral vowel was ㅣ i. The yin vowels were ㅡㅜㅓ eu, u, eo; the dots are in the yin directions of 'down' and 'left'. The yang vowels were ㆍㅗㅏ, ə, o, a, with the dots in the yang directions of 'up' and 'right'. The Hunmin Jeong-eum states that the shapes of the non-dotted letters ㅡㆍㅣ were also chosen to represent the concepts of yin (flat earth), yang (sun in heaven), and mediation (upright man). (The letter ㆍ ə is now obsolete.)

There was a third parameter in designing the vowel letters, namely, choosing ㅡ as the graphic base of ㅜ and ㅗ, and ㅣ as the base of ㅓ and ㅏ. A full understanding of what these horizontal and vertical groups had in common would require knowing the exact sound values these vowels had in the 15th century. Our uncertainty is primarily with the letters ㆍㅓㅏ. However, the horizontal letters ㅡㅜㅗ do appear to have all represented mid to high back vowels, .

References

 Ledyard, Gari K. The Korean Language Reform of 1446. Seoul: Shingu munhwasa, 1998.
 Ledyard, Gari. "The International Linguistic Background of the Correct Sounds for the Instruction of the People." In Young-Key Kim-Renaud, ed. The Korean Alphabet: Its History and Structure. Honolulu: University of Hawai'i Press, 1997.
 Andrew West. The Mĕnggŭ Zìyùn 蒙古字韻 "Mongolian Letters arranged by Rhyme"

External links
Faculty profile at Columbia University Center for Korean Research
"An Interview with Gari Ledyard", The Review of Korean Studies Vol.6 No.1, June 2003, p. 143

Living people
Defense Language Institute alumni
Writers from Syracuse, New York
Writers from San Rafael, California
University of Michigan alumni
1932 births
Columbia University faculty